Der Januskopf is a 1920 German silent film  directed by F. W. Murnau. The film was an adaptation of Robert Louis Stevenson's 1886 novella The Strange Case of Dr. Jekyll and Mr. Hyde. Little is known about the production; it was shot and previewed under the title Schrecken  with production starting in either February or March 1920.

The film received great acclaim in Germany from trade publication and newspapers on its release, specifically noting the performance by Conrad Veidt. The film is a lost film and has been described by Bela Lugosi biographers Gary Rhodes and Bill Kaffenberger as being "among the most sought-after lost films" due to its initial critical acclaim and what Robert Louis Stevenson researcher Steve Joyce described as an "all-star" film team of cinematographer Karl Freund, director F. W. Murnau and actors Conrad Veidt and Bela Lugosi.

Plot
The surviving script for the film refers to Dr.Jeskyll who lives in London. Jeskyll purchases a bust in an antique store with two faces: one beautiful and one horrible. The bust becomes an obsession to Jeskyll who attempts to give it away in an auction only to buy it back.

Cast 
Cast adapted from Filmportal.de and Gary Don Rhodes and Bill Kaffenberger's Becoming Dracula - The Early Years of Bela Lugosi.

Production
The film was developed under the name Schrecken and directed by F.W. Murnau at an early point of what would become authors Gary Don Rhodes and Bill Kaffenberger described as "illustrious career in Germany and America".  At this point, Murnau had only directed three feature films.

The film is based on Robert Louis Stevenson's novella Strange Case of Dr Jekyll and Mr Hyde (1886).  The screenplay for the film was written by Hans Janowitz. Exactly when the film titled Schrecken was shot is hard to determine. One published production calendar suggest it was shot in late February 1920 but as the cinematographer for the film Karl Freund was not reported as hired until March 6, it is possible it was shortly after. Little is known about the film's production outside an industry trade later claiming that star Conrad Veidt had to "undergo training to be able to take his shaggy hair and turn it into something fashionable". Unlike Murnau's Nosferatu, the film did not hide its origin story with published ads in Film-Kurier and Lichtbild-Buhne noting its origin to Stevenson's novella.

Release and reception
The film had a trade preview under the title Schrecken in late April 1920. According to review from this period, the characters names are given as Jekyll rather than Jeskyll. On the trade preview from April 1920, the film received praise from publications Lichtbild-Bühne and Film-Kurier, both specifically noting Conrad Veidt's performance.  Following a screening on June 20, a critic in Neue Kino-Rundschau declared that the film "belongs to the best that German film art has produced. The direction by F.W. Murnau is a textbook example and Konrad  Veidt gives an unsurpassed masterly performance."

The production company Lipow-Film struck a distribution deal with Decla-Bishop due to the popular response the previews. When Schrecken premiered at Berlin's Marmorhaus-Lichtspiele on August 26, 1920, it had a new title of Der Januskopf and was subtitled eine Tragödie am Rande der Wirklichkeit. In this version, the characters of Dr. Jekyll and Mr. Hyde are changed to Dr. Warren and Mr. O'Connor respectively. Following the films premiere, Rhodes and Kaffenberger found the industry reviews to be "overwhelmingly positive" with Lichtbild-Bühne  finding the film to be "a great success on account of its breathtaking suspense, and that Conrad Veidt is to be heartily congratulated for his unsurpassable, masterful performance.” while Der Film stated it was "fabulously suspenseful," with "superb" acting and "excellent" cinematography. Another review in Erste Internationale Film-Zeitung went ont to say the film recalled The Cabinet of Dr. Caligari and that "generally speaking, one can say that this new drama is equal to Caligari, and even outdoes it in a few gripping scenes" and that Veidt "has completely outdone himself – and all his previous performances."

According to Lichtbild-Bühne, the film was popular with German audiences, stating that the film “has achieved widespread success, which we had predicted….” Despite some sources stating the film was released in the United States as Love's Mockery, that was actually the title for Murnau's Der Gang in die Nacht (1921). It was released in the Netherlands under the title Het Geheim van Dr. Warren.

Legacy
Rhodes and Kaffenberger stated the film was "among the most sought-after lost films". Steve Joyce discussed the urgency related to the film being found in his overview of silent era The Strange Case of Dr.Jekyll and Mr. Hyde adaptations, specifically the interest in grand contemporary reviews and an "all-star creative team" noting Veidt, Murnau, Freund and Bela Lugosi in a small role as a butler.

See also 
 1920 in science fiction
 Bela Lugosi filmography
 List of German films of 1920
 List of lost films

References

Sources

External links 
 
 Der Januskopf at SilentEra
 

1920 films
German black-and-white films
Dr. Jekyll and Mr. Hyde films
Films directed by F. W. Murnau
Films of the Weimar Republic
German silent feature films
Films produced by Erich Pommer
Lost German films
1920 lost films
1920s German films